Alan Fowler is the name of:

Alan Fowler (footballer) (1911–1944), English footballer
Alan Fowler (physicist) (born 1928), American scientist